A , or water bowl, is a vessel used to rinse the hands in Japanese temples, shrines and gardens. Usually made of stone, it plays an important role in the tea ceremony. Guests use it to wash their hands before entering the tearoom, a practice originally adapted from the custom of rinsing one’s mouth and cleansing one’s body in the chōzuya before entering the sacred precincts of a Shinto shrine or a Buddhist temple.

Prior to modern plumbing, Japanese homes contained a chōdzu-bachi with a dipper, and provisions for drainage of wastewater, placed so that it could be used from the engawa (veranda or corridor). A towel was often hung nearby. One would be placed near the entrance of a latrine, though there might also be chōdzu-bachi elsewhere.

There are many types of chōzu-bachi; for instance, a low chōzu-bachi, with attendant stones, is called a tsukubai and is often found in tea-gardens. Chōzu-bachi are usually stone, but may be made of other materials, such as ceramic or bronze.

Gallery

See also
 Chōzuya

Notes

Chadō
Water and religion
Ritual purification
Japanese architectural features
Shinto in Japan
Garden features